Axinyssa is a genus of sea sponges belonging to the family Halichondriidae.

Species 
 Axinyssa aculeata Wilson, 1925
 Axinyssa ambrosia (Laubenfels, 1936)
 Axinyssa aplysinoides (Dendy, 1922)
 Axinyssa aurantiaca (Schmidt, 1864)
 Axinyssa bergquistae (Hooper, Cook, Hobbs & Kennedy, 1997)
 Axinyssa cavernosa (Topsent, 1897)
 Axinyssa digitata (Cabioch, 1968)
 Axinyssa diversicolor (Carballo, 2000)
 Axinyssa djiferi Boury-Esnault, Marschal, Kornprobst & Barnathan, 2002
 Axinyssa gracilis (Hentschel, 1912)
 Axinyssa gravieri Topsent, 1906
 Axinyssa isabela Carballo & Cruz-Barraza, 2008
 Axinyssa mertoni (Hentschel, 1912)
 Axinyssa michaelis Kefalas & Castritsi-Catharios, 2007
 Axinyssa oinops (de Laubenfels, 1954)
 Axinyssa papillosa (Sarà & Siribelli, 1962)
 Axinyssa papuensis Thomas, 2002
 Axinyssa paradoxa (Ridley & Dendy, 1886)
 Axinyssa radiata (Lévi & Lévi, 1983)
 Axinyssa tenax Pulitzer-Finali, 1993
 Axinyssa tenuispiculata (Burton, 1931)
 Axinyssa terpnis (De Laubenfels, 1954)
 Axinyssa tethyoides Kirkpatrick, 1903
 Axinyssa topsenti Lendenfeld, 1897
 Axinyssa tuscara (Ristau, 1978)
 Axinyssa valida (Thiele, 1899)
 Axinyssa variabilis (Lindgren, 1897)
 Axinyssa yumae (Pulitzer-Finali, 1986)

References 

Halichondrida